Sorabh Pant is an Indian stand-up comedian and writer. He has performed over 250 shows. He was rated amongst India's top 10 stand-up comedians by The Times of India. In a poll by IBN Live in March 2012, he was listed No. 1 of the 30 most interesting Twitter users in India.

Career
Pant started as a writer for television. In March 2008, he met Vir Das and they did a show together on CNBC-TV18 called News on The Loose. Pant's career in comedy took off when he started as the opening act for Vir Das's show, Walking on Broken Das, later that year. After working with Das for three and a half years, he did his first solo act at HQ. In November 2009, he became one of just three Indian comedians to hit auditoriums with his solo show, Pant on Fire.

Sorabh also featured in F.A.Q. on Pogo .

In July 2011, when Wayne Brady toured India, Pant was his opening act. In November 2011, Pant opened for American actor and comedian Rob Schneider on his India tour.

Pant released his debut novel The Wednesday Soul in December 2011.

Pant on Fire
Pant on Fire is Sorabh Pant's first comedy special, and was staged in more than 10 cities in India, Dhaka, and Dubai. The tour reached North America in November 2012.

Traveling Pants
Traveling Pants is a comedy special which takes on cultures and people in India and around the world. In July 2012, it became the second show by an Indian comedian to be showcased at the coveted Comedy Store, Mumbai.

The East India Comedy
In 2012, Pant founded comedy company The East India Comedy, and over the next year recruited comedians Kunal Rao, Sapan Verma, Sahil Shah, Atul Khatri, Azeem Banatwalla and Angad Singh Ranyal. Pant and Khatri are no longer a part of EIC.

The East India Comedy performed 130 shows across the country in 2013, including the specials Men Are From Bars and Comedy News Network.

Comedic style
Pant's material has been described as "over the top", "manic", and occasionally "marginally unstable."

Wayne Brady, for whom Pant has opened, has said: "He's the second brilliant Indian comedian I've seen, after Russell Peters."

Pant's jokes take a dig at communities and involve a lot of sex – two things which he says work "big time" in India. He also does impersonations of communities, and some of his jokes are about women. Pant says, "I am a home-grown comedian. I have the Indian sensibility". He has also been working on a lot of material that revolves around politics and puns.

The Wednesday Soul
Pant's book, The Wednesday Soul, is a "fictitious and comic take on life after death". It was published by Westland Books.

Personal life 
His sister is author Meghna Pant.

References

External links

Official website
East India Co.medy
The Wednesday Soul

Indian male comedians
Indian stand-up comedians
Living people
1981 births